Gorbulino is a rural locality (a khutor) in Lobazovsky Selsoviet Rural Settlement, Oktyabrsky District, Kursk Oblast, Russia. Population:

Geography 
The khutor is located 69 km from the Russia–Ukraine border, 20 km south-west of Kursk, 9 km south of the district center – the urban-type settlement Pryamitsyno, at the western border of the selsoviet center – Zhuravlino.

 Climate
Gorbulino has a warm-summer humid continental climate (Dfb in the Köppen climate classification).

Transport 
Gorbulino is located 6 km from the federal route  Crimea Highway (a part of the European route ), on the road of regional importance  ("Crimea Highway" – Ivanino, part of the European route ), on the road of intermunicipal significance  (38K-010 – Lebedin), 9 km from the nearest railway station Dyakonovo (railway line Lgov I — Kursk).

The rural locality is situated 30 km from Kursk Vostochny Airport, 109 km from Belgorod International Airport and 226 km from Voronezh Peter the Great Airport.

References

Notes

Sources

Rural localities in Oktyabrsky District, Kursk Oblast